The Beverly rooming house fire took place at the Elliott Chambers, a low-rent rooming house in Beverly, Massachusetts, on July 4, 1984. The fire was set by a man whose ex-girlfriend was going out with someone who was staying in the building. It was the deadliest arson fire in Massachusetts, the deadliest fire in the state since the Cocoanut Grove fire in 1942, and the deadliest fire in Beverly's history.

Background
The fire occurred in the Elliott Chambers, an 80-year old, three-story wooden frame building that had 34 rooms on the top two floors and housed businesses on the first. The rooming house was located on the corner of Rantoul and Elliott Streets in downtown Beverly and catered to deinstitutionalized mental patients, intellectually disabled people, substance abusers, elderly, transients, and other low-income individuals, many of whom had been placed there by the Massachusetts Department of Mental Health or another human services agency. The small rooms cost $150 to $175 per month and contained a bed, sink, refrigerator, and bureau. Residents shared common bathrooms. 

It was owned by David and Pauline Faxler and managed by 73-year old Hattie Whary and valued between $100,000 and $150,000. It had working smoke detectors, fire extinguishers, and emergency lights, and a fire escape, but did not contain firewalls, fire stops, or sprinklers. According to the city's mayor, building inspector, and fire chief it met the minimum standards for safety.

Fire
The fire broke out around 4 am on July 4, 1984. According to a report by the National Fire Protection Association, the fire started in an alcove, moved across flammable wooden paneling above the alcove, and spread throughout the building via an unenclosed stairway. The fire moved so quickly that it had already reached the top floor by the time the fire alarm had sounded. By the time most residents were awakened, passage to the fire escape was already blocked. The Beverly Fire Department responded within two minutes of receiving the alarm. The second and third floors were gutted while the first floor was relatively intact. 

At the time of the fire there were 33 residents and three guests in the building. Thirteen people died in the fire. The second floor victims burned to death while those on the third floor died from smoke inhalation. Five were found near a locked fire escape door and six were still in bed. A fourteenth victim died after jumping from a third story window.  12 survivors were taken to area hospitals. One firefighter and one police officer were also hospitalized. Some of the bodies were so badly burned they were difficult to identify. The final victims were not identified until July 8 when doctors were able to identify them using dental and x-ray records. On August 5, the fire's fifteenth victim died at Brigham and Women's Hospital from burn injuries.

Investigation
On July 5, 1984, state Public Safety Secretary Charles V. Barry announced that a preliminary investigation indicated the cause of the fire to be arson. According to investigators, the fire was caused by gasoline-soaked newspapers that had been lit in an alcove adjacent to the front entrance to the rooming house.

The prime suspect in the arson was James Carver, a 20-year old part-time pizza cook and taxi driver whose ex-girlfriend was dating someone who was staying in the building. Carver was committed to a mental hospital within a week of the fire and attempted suicide shortly thereafter. The investigation stalled until late 1987, when the Essex County district attorney's office received information that Carver had confessed to a female friend. On April 21, 1988, a witness identified Carver in a police lineup as the man he saw near the Elliott Chambers shortly before the fire.

Trials
On May 4, 1988, nearly four years after the fire, Carver was arrested. He pleaded not guilty to 15 counts of second-degree murder, 15 counts of assault and battery with intent to murder, and one count of arson.

Carver's trial began on March 7, 1989. On March 24, Judge Peter F. Brady declared a mistrial based on a motion from Carver's attorney, Dennis F. Jackson, who contended that the prosecution had violated discovery procedures by not providing him with an incriminating statement a witness had given to police until the trial was already underway. District Attorney Kevin M. Burke called Brady's decision "inappropriate" and "unjust" and declared that his office would "vigorously reprosecute" the case.

Carver's second trial was held in November 1989. The prosecution alleged that in October 1984, Carver had told a friend that he had set the fire and told her how he had set it, and in November 1986 had told a co-worker that he had lit the fire but that he was going to get away with it. The prosecution also presented a witness who testified that a day before the fire Carver had threatened Rick Nickerson, the Elliott Chambers resident who had gone out with Carver's ex-girlfriend. Carver's parents contended that he was home in bed when the fire occurred. On November 22, 1989, Carver was found guilty of murder and arson. He was sentenced to two consecutive life sentences to be served as the maximum-security Massachusetts Correctional Institution – Cedar Junction with eligibility for parole after 30 years.

In 2020, Carver, who has a history of cardiovascular disease, skin cancer, and depression, uses a wheelchair due to dizziness, vertigo, tremors and seizures he has suffered from since brain surgery, and has been diagnosed with, but is refusing treatment for, prostate cancer, sought a medical parole on the grounds that he was "highly likely" to become incapacitated if he contracted COVID-19. His petition was denied by the state commissioner of corrections and the decision was upheld by a Superior Court judge.

Effect on building codes
In the wake of the fire, Mayor F. John Monahan called on the state legislature to strengthen the state's fire code. Legislators and local officials called for a law to require sprinklers and other fire safety systems in rooming houses. Governor Michael Dukakis stated that he opposed such a law, as it would drive up the cost of housing. A proposed law requiring sprinklers in stairways of residential buildings died in the legislature due to opposition from building owners. However, in 1986 the legislature did pass a bill that gave local governments the option to require automatic sprinklers in buildings occupied by six or more unrelated people. During the early 1980s, the state saw an average of between seven and nine fire deaths per year in rooming houses. After the law was passed, this number decreased quickly, with zero deaths occurring in 1992. As of 2014, 134 of the state's 351 municipalities have adopted the measure.

Memorial
The Elliott Chambers building was rebuilt into a two-story professional office building. In 2009 it was demolished and replaced by a CVS Pharmacy. A plaque listing the names of the fire's victims was placed on the corner of Elliott and Rantoul Streets.

References

1984 fires in the United States
1984 in Massachusetts
Arson in Massachusetts
Beverly, Massachusetts
Hotel fires in the United States
July 1984 events